Niki Aebersold (born 5 July 1972 in Freimettigen) is a former Swiss professional road bicycle racer who rode for UCI ProTeam Phonak Hearing Systems from May 2003 to 2005. He was the Swiss National Road Race champion in 1998.

Palmarès

1995
 1st, Stage 5, Regio-Tour
1997
 1st, Overall, Ostschweizer Rundfahrt
 Winner Mountains & Points Competition
 Winner Stages 1, 2, 3, 4 & 5
 1st, Stage 9, Tour de Suisse
 2nd, Overall, GP Tell
 Winner Stage 1
 3rd, National Road Race Championship
1998
  Road Race Champion
 1st, Milano–Torino
 1st, Overall, OBV Classic
 Winner Points Competition
 1st, Stages 7 & 9, Tour de Suisse
 1st, Stage 2, Tour of Austria
 5th, World Road Race Championship
1999
 6th, Liège–Bastogne–Liège
 7th, Tour of the Basque Country
2000
 6th, World Road Race Championship
2001
 1st, 6-days of Zürich
 2nd, Milano–Torino
 8th, Züri-Metzgete
2003
 3rd, National Road Race Championship
2004
 1st, Mountains Competition, Tour de Suisse
 Winner Stage 6

References

External links 

Personal Site

1972 births
Living people
Swiss male cyclists
People from Bern-Mittelland District
Tour de Suisse stage winners
Sportspeople from the canton of Bern